Wither Blister Burn + Peel is the second album by the American industrial rock band Stabbing Westward, released on Columbia Records. The album was recorded in New York in May 1995, and released in New York City and Los Angeles on January 4, 1996. The album was released throughout the rest of the United States on January 23, 1996. It includes the singles "What Do I Have To Do?" and "Shame". Wither Blister Burn & Peel was certified gold on September 27, 1996.

"What Do I Have To Do?" was the band's first hit, thanks to heavy MTV exposure, first reaching the Modern Rock Tracks chart, where it would peak at #11, then achieving even greater success on the Mainstream Rock Tracks chart, where it peaked at #7. "Shame" was released soon after, matching "What Do I Have To Do"'s #7 peak on the Mainstream Rock chart, and peaking at #14 on the Modern Rock chart.

Track listing

Personnel 
 Christopher Hall – lead vocals, guitar, drum machine programming
 Jim Sellers – bass, guitar
 Walter Flakus – keyboards, programming, backing vocals
 Andy Kubiszewski – drums, guitar, keyboards

Appearances 
The song "What Do I Have to Do?" was featured in the movie Masterminds in 1997. It was later featured in the Smallville episode "Tempest" in 2002.

References 

1996 albums
Albums produced by John Fryer (producer)
Columbia Records albums
Stabbing Westward albums